Whittingham may refer to:

Whittingham (surname)

Places
 Whittingham, Lancashire, England
 Whittingham, Northumberland, England
 Whittingham, New Jersey, a US unincorporated area
 Whittingham, New South Wales, in Australia

See also